Little Dixie is an unincorporated community in Prairie and Woodruff counties, Arkansas, United States.

Notes

Unincorporated communities in Prairie County, Arkansas
Unincorporated communities in Woodruff County, Arkansas
Unincorporated communities in Arkansas